James Manson (1845–1935) was a Scottish engineer, born in Saltcoats, Ayrshire. He was Locomotive Superintendent of two Scottish railway companies.

Career
Manson obtained employment at the Kilmarnock works of the Glasgow and South Western Railway (GSWR) in September 1861 and worked there for eight years. He then spent one year at Barclay Curle and Company, shipbuilders of Govan. This was followed by five years at sea with the Bibby Line during which time he became a chief engineer. He worked again at the GSWR Kilmarnock works from 1875 to October 1883. His next appointment was as Locomotive Superintendent at the Great North of Scotland Railway but he returned to the GSWR in 1890 or 1891 and was appointed Locomotive Superintendent.

Retirement and death
Manson retired from the GSWR in 1911. He died in Kilmarnock on 5 June 1935.

See also
Locomotives of the Great North of Scotland Railway
Locomotives of the Glasgow and South Western Railway

References

1845 births
1935 deaths
19th-century Scottish people
People from Ayr
Scottish engineers
Scottish railway mechanical engineers
Glasgow and South Western Railway people